Mathieu Barthélemy Thouin (born 1804 in Paris) was a 19th-century French playwright. 

His plays were presented on the most important Parisian stages of the 19th century, including the Théâtre des Variétés, the Théâtre des Délassements-Comiques, the Théâtre de la Gaîté, and the Théâtre du Vaudeville.

Works 
 Les Cuisiniers diplomates, one-act comédie en vaudevilles, with Michel Masson and Edmond Rochefort, 1828
 Le Dernier jour d'un condamné, époque de la vie d'un romantique, in 1 tableau, with a prologue in verse, with Armand d'Artois, Victor Hugo and Michel Masson, 1829
1830: L'Épée, le bâton et le chausson, comédie en vaudevilles in 4 tableaux, with Victor Lhérie and Jérôme-Léon Vidal
1831: La Jeunesse de Talma, one-act comédie en vaudevilles, with Brunswick and Lhérie
1831: Mme Lavalette, historical drama in 2 acts, with Brunswick and Lhérie
1831: Le Mort sous le scellé, one-act folie, mingled with couplets, with Lhérie and Vidal
1832: L'Art de ne pas monter sa garde, one-act comédie en vaudevilles, with Lhérie
1832: Le Conseil de révision, ou Les Mauvais numéros, tableau-vaudeville in 1 act, with Lhérie and Léon Lévy Brunswick
1832: L'Audience du Roi, one-act comédie en vaudevilles
1832: Une Course en fiacre, two-act comédie en vaudevilles, with Ernest Jaime
1834: La Gueule de lion, one-act comedy, mingled with singing, with Brunswick
1834: Le Prix de vertu, ou les Trois baisers, comédie en vaudevilles in 5 tableaux, with Brunswick
1834: Si j'étais grand !, five-act comedy mingled with couplets, with Brunswick
1835: La Fille de Robert Macaire, humorous melodrama in 2 acts, with Julien de Mallian
1836: La Barrière des martyrs, prologue in 1 act, with Eugène Fillot and Fleury1
1836: Le Camarade de chambrée, one-act comédie en vaudevilles, with Fillot
1836: L'Ennemi intime, two-act comédie en vaudevilles, with Léon-Lévy Brunswick and Louis-Émile Vanderburch
1836: Les Petits métiers, tableau populaire in  act, mingled with couplets, with Fillot
1836: La Sonnette de nuit, one-act comédie en vaudevilles, with Jaime and Brunswick
1837: L'École de danse à 75 centimes le cachet, tableau-vaudeville in 1 acte, with Fillot
1837: La Page 24, ou les Souvenirs de ma grand'mère, one-act comédie en vaudevilles, with Adolphe de Leuven and Lhérie
1837: Les Pages du Czar, ou Lequel des deux ?, one-act comédie en vaudevilles, with Fillot
1843: Cantatrice et marquise, three-act comédie en vaudevilles, with Fillot
1845: Le Coiffeur des dames, one-act comédie en vaudevilles
1845: Un Voyage à Paris, three-act comédie en vaudevilles, with Achille Bourdois
1846: La Faute du mari, two-act comédie en vaudevilles, with Auguste Jouhaud
1846: Le Zodiaque, satires
1847: Les Filles d'honneur de la reine, one-act comédie en vaudevilles, with Fillot
1847: L'Hospitalité d'une grisette, one-act comédie en vaudevilles, with Delacour
1849: Un Déluge d'inventions, revue de l'exposition de l'industrie, three-act comédie en vaudevilles
1849: Le Gibier du Roi, one-act comédie en vaudevilles, with Alfred Delacour
1852: Le Roi, la dame et le valet, three-act comédie en vaudevilles, with Fillot

Bibliography 
 Gustave Vapereau, Dictionnaire universel des contemporains, 1861, (pp. 115)

19th-century French dramatists and playwrights
1804 births
Writers from Paris
Year of death missing